Pat Duquette (born November 4, 1970) is the head men's basketball coach at UMass Lowell. He is the first coach in the school's Division I history, as the River Hawks joined the America East Conference for the 2013–14 season.

Biography

Coaching career
After graduation from Williams College in 1993, where he captained the men's basketball team, Duquette interned with the New Jersey Nets while simultaneously coaching at Centenary College of New Jersey. He then moved on St. Lawrence University in 1994–95 for a one-year stint as an assistant before landing at Saint Michael's College for two seasons, where he helped guide the Purple Knights to a Northeast-10 Conference title and appearance in the NCAA Tournament.

Duquette joined Al Skinner's staff at Boston College, where he stayed for 13 seasons, starting in an administrative role, moving all the way up to the role of associate head coach in his final season. He was a part of Eagles squads that went to six NCAA Tournaments, and the 2004–05 Big East Conference regular season championship. In 2010–11, he moved across Boston to Northeastern as associate head coach, reuniting him with former BC assistant Bill Coen.

On May 16, 2013, Duquette was named the eighth coach in UMass Lowell history, replacing Greg Herenda.

Personal life
Duquette is the younger brother of Jim Duquette, the former general manager of the New York Mets and Baltimore Orioles. His cousin, Dan Duquette, is the former general manager of the Boston Red Sox, Montreal Expos, and Baltimore Orioles.

Head coaching record

College

References

1970 births
Living people
American men's basketball coaches
American men's basketball players
Basketball coaches from Massachusetts
Basketball players from Massachusetts
Boston College Eagles men's basketball coaches
College men's basketball head coaches in the United States
Northeastern Huskies men's basketball coaches
People from Dalton, Massachusetts
Saint Michael's Purple Knights men's basketball coaches
UMass Lowell River Hawks men's basketball coaches
Williams Ephs men's basketball players
Sportspeople from Berkshire County, Massachusetts